Browns Park National Wildlife Refuge is a  U.S. National Wildlife Refuge located in northwestern Colorado. Established in 1965, the refuge is managed by the United States Fish and Wildlife Service office in Maybell, Colorado. The refuge consists of bottomland and adjacent benchland. The western border of the refuge is the Colorado-Utah state line. The refuge is surrounded by adjacent lines of the Bureau of Land Management. The refuge contains the site of the former Fort Davy Crockett that was constructed in 1837 to protect trappers against attacks by Blackfoot Native Americans.

Description
The acquisition of the refuge lands was approved by the Migratory Bird Conservation Commission on August 20, 1963 in order to develop and manage waterfowl habitat in that portion of Browns Park within the state of Colorado. The private land was purchased with funds from the Migratory Bird Hunting Stamp Act. The first tract of private land was acquired on July 13, 1965. There is one private inholding on the refuge, a  tract of grassland and cottonwood groves located at the southeast end of the refuge.

The primary purpose of the refuge is to provide high quality nesting and migration habitat for the Great Basin Canada goose, ducks and other migratory birds. Before the construction of Flaming Gorge Dam in 1962, the Green River flooded annually, creating excellent waterfowl nesting, feeding and resting marshes in the backwater sloughs and old stream meanders. The dam stopped the flooding, eliminating much of this waterfowl habitat. The river covers approximately  along with sedimentary river bottomlands. The remainder of the refuge is alluvial benchlands and steep rocky mountain slopes.

The refuge is home to approximately 200 species of birds at various times of the year. Nesting birds in the refuge include mallards, redheads, teal, canvasbacks, other ducks, and Canada geese. About 300 goslings and 2,500 ducklings hatch there annually. The waterfowl population typically swells by thousands during the spring and fall migrations. Bald eagles frequent the refuge during the winter. Golden eagles and peregrine falcons are seen soaring over the refuge during spring and summer. Bird watching is available at several locations in habitats ranging from semi-arid sage brush to lush wetlands and cottonwood stands adjacent to the Green River.

The refuge is also home to mammal species such as deer, elk, pronghorn, and an occasional bighorn sheep, especially during moderate or severe winters. Moose are found in the wet, riparian areas during the spring, summer and fall. Deer and elk are commonly seen anywhere on the refuge during moderate to severe winters. River otter use the Green River and refuge wetlands year round.

See also
 Browns Park
 Cold Spring Mountain
 List of National Wildlife Refuges

References

External links

 

National Wildlife Refuges in Colorado
Protected areas of Moffat County, Colorado
Bureau of Land Management areas in Colorado
Protected areas established in 1965
Wetlands of Colorado
Landforms of Moffat County, Colorado